Eupithecia venosata, the netted pug, is a moth of the family Geometridae. It was first described by Johan Christian Fabricius in 1787. It is found across the Palearctic realm from Portugal and Morocco in the west to the Lake Baikal in Siberia and Afghanistan and Pakistan in the east.

Description
The length of the forewings is 10–14 mm. The ground colour of the forewings and hindwings is brown to creamy white The forewings are large and round. Several light, black-edged, lines and the partly black coloured veins form a characteristic lattice. The hindwings have a similar, but greatly weakened pattern. Very strongly resembles Eupithecia schiefereri and is distinguishable from this clearly only by means of a genital examination.

Forma
fumosae Gregson (= nubilata Bohatsch, grisea Dietze) is a dark smoke-coloured race from the Shetland Islands. — In ab. bandanae  Gregson the white bands remain conspicuous on the smoky ground. Among fumosae. — ochracae Gregson (= orcadensis Prout) also has the ground-colour darkened, but ochreous or clay-yellowish, not smoky; markings normal or sometimes weakened as in fumosae  Orkney Islands.. 
See subspecies.
The larva is pale pinkish grey, darker on the back, with scattered, upstanding brushes. The pupa is shiny brown-yellow with a dark brown cremaster, which has at the base five beaded elevations and a stretched tip with several bristles.

Biology
The moth flies from April to June depending on the location.

The larvae feed spun up on Silene species, preferably Silene vulgaris, Silene dioica and Silene maritima.The pupa hibernates sometimes for two winters

Subspecies
 Eupithecia venosata venosata
 Eupithecia venosata fumosae Gregson, 1887
 Eupithecia venosata hebridensis Curtis, 1944
 Eupithecia venosata ochracae Gregson, 1886
 Eupithecia venosata plumbea Huggins, 1962

References

External links
 
 
 Netted Pug on UKMoths
 Lepiforum e.V.
 De Vlinderstichting 

venosata
Moths described in 1787
Moths of Africa
Moths of Asia
Moths of Europe
Taxa named by Johan Christian Fabricius